Afroedura major, also known as the major rock gecko, Swazi flat gecko, or giant Swazi flat gecko, is a species of African gecko endemic to Eswatini (formerly Swaziland).

References

major
Reptiles of Eswatini
Endemic fauna of Eswatini
Reptiles described in 1984